Graham Williams (born January 15, 1978) is a concert promoter based in Austin, Texas, USA, and a partner in the Austin-based booking agency Transmission Entertainment. He was the booker and manager of the Austin music venue Emo's from the late 1990s to mid-2007.  

Williams was born and raised in Austin, Texas, except for a brief period in Virginia while his mother attended UVA and his father worked at UVA Medical Center.  By the time he was a teenager, he was already running his own record label, playing in a band, had toured the country, and was booking shows as a hobby. After graduating from Stephen F. Austin High School in 1996, he got a job in the music business working for Emo's Alternative Lounging.  

Williams started Austin's annual Fun Fun Fun Fest in 2006 at Waterloo Park.  The festival has grown in popularity and is recognized as one America's significant indie music festivals.

Personal life
In 1999, Williams married Audrie San Miguel. They celebrated their tenth anniversary on May 22, 2009.

References 

Music of Austin, Texas
Austin High School (Austin, Texas) alumni
People from Austin, Texas
Living people
American music industry executives
1978 births
Music promoters